Marius Jacques Kloppers (born 26 August 1962) is a South African-born Australian businessman and former CEO of BHP Billiton, the world's largest mining company. He was also Executive Director and Chairman of the Group Management Committee from 2007 to 2013. He was asked to retire as CEO on 1 October 2013, and was succeeded by Andrew Mackenzie.

Education 
Kloppers graduated from Helpmekaar Kollege, then a public school in Johannesburg (IEB currently). Kloppers graduated with a Bachelor of Chemical Engineering from the University of Pretoria and subsequently went on to receive a PhD at Massachusetts Institute of Technology. He also graduated with an MBA from INSEAD.

Career 
Kloppers worked in petrochemicals at Sasol and materials research with Mintek in South Africa. Following completion of his MBA at INSEAD, he then worked with management consultants McKinsey & Co in Netherlands before joining Billiton in 1993. In 2007, at the age of 44, he was appointed CEO of the largest resource company in the world, BHP Billiton. He officially assumed the position of CEO on 1 October 2007. In 2009 his annual compensation was $US 10,399,589, of which $2M was salary and the balance was bonus.

References

External links 
 Sydney Morning Herald Article 31 May 2007

1962 births
Living people
People from Cape Town
South African businesspeople
South African chief executives
South African corporate directors
University of Pretoria alumni
INSEAD alumni
Massachusetts Institute of Technology alumni
McKinsey & Company people
Fellows of the Australian Academy of Technological Sciences and Engineering
BHP people